Tiago Coelho Branco Calvano (born 19 May 1981), sometimes known as just Tiago, is a former Brazilian footballer.

Career
Calvano is a defender with Italian citizenship who made 13 Campeonato Brasileiro Série A appearances for Botafogo before moving to Europe.

Newcastle Jets
In May 2011, it was announced that he signed a two-year contract with Newcastle Jets FC, joining them for the 2011–12 and 2012–13 A-League seasons. Calvano impressed during his first season with the Jets. Despite giving away three penalties he was very solid in the back which persuaded incoming coach Gary Van Egmond to keep him in the starting eleven. He scored his first goal for Newcastle in a round five match against Perth Glory in the 2012-13 A-League season. Tiago was released by the Newcastle Jets on 17 January 2013, due to lack of game time and a rumoured falling out of favour with head coach Van Egmond.

Sydney FC
On 17 January 2013, Tiago signed with Sydney FC as an injury replacement for Pascal Bosschaart. Coming straight into the starting eleven after signing for Sydney, he made his debut in Sydney's 7–1 demolition of Wellington Phoenix at Allianz Stadium. Sydney made his position permanent, signing a one-year deal with the club for the 2013–14 A-League season.

Minnesota United
Towards the end of his contract, Tiago and Sydney FC agreed  to a mutual termination of his contract to allow him to take up an offer of a contract in the United States for NASL side Minnesota United FC.

Harrisburg City Islanders
Tiago signed with USL side Harrisburg City Islanders on 23 March 2017.

References

1981 births
Living people
Brazilian expatriate footballers
Brazilian expatriate sportspeople in the United States
Botafogo de Futebol e Regatas players
A.C. Perugia Calcio players
FC Barcelona Atlètic players
BSC Young Boys players
MSV Duisburg players
Fortuna Düsseldorf players
Fortuna Düsseldorf II players
Newcastle Jets FC players
Sydney FC players
Minnesota United FC (2010–2016) players
Penn FC players
Association football defenders
Brazilian people of Italian descent
Swiss Super League players
2. Bundesliga players
A-League Men players
North American Soccer League players
Expatriate footballers in Italy
Expatriate footballers in Germany
Expatriate footballers in Switzerland
Footballers from Rio de Janeiro (city)
Brazilian footballers
Expatriate soccer players in Australia
Expatriate soccer players in the United States